Djeneba Seck (born 1970) is an African singer and actress born in Bamako, (Mali). Her family's roots are in Kita, a town famous for its music. In 1986 she met Sekou Kouyate who took her on as a backing vocalist for his band. They had a hit song called "N'Kadignon Ye".

References 

1970 births
Living people
20th-century Malian women singers
People from Bamako
21st-century Malian people